Carmen Winant (born 1983) is a writer and visual artist who explores representations of women through collage, mixed media and installation.

Early life and education 
Winant was born in 1983 in San Francisco, California. She received her MFA from California College of the Arts, where she studied with the photographer Larry Sultan.  In 2010, she was a resident at the Skowhegan School of Painting and Sculpture.

Career 
Winant's large-scale collages present a mosaic of clippings of women's figures and bodies. In the photographic installation My Birth she collected and displayed over 2,000 images of women giving birth. In a book by the same name, Winant includes photos of her mother's childbirths. Similarly, her work Looking Forward to Being Attacked is composed of found images of women in self defense classes.

She also makes collages that combine text and image, such as What Would You Do if You Weren’t Afraid? (Women in the News Before November 8, 2016).

She previously taught at the Columbus College of Art and Design in Columbus, Ohio. In August of 2018, she joined The Ohio State University Department of Art faculty as the first Roy Lichtenstein Chair of Studio Art.

Solo exhibitions 
 2016: Pictures of Women Working, Skibum MacArthur, Los Angeles, California.
 2016: Who Says Pain is Erotic?, Fortnight Institute, New York City.

Publications 

 Carmen Winant: My Birth, Ithaca, NY : SPBH Editions, 2018.

References

External links 

Interview with Carmen Winant MoMA Audio: Being: New Photography 2018
Nina Strand: Lesbian Lands: Carmen Winant and the Ovulars, Camera Austria International 149 | 2020

1983 births
Living people
University of California, Los Angeles alumni
American collage artists
Women collage artists
Women installation artists
Artists from California
American installation artists
21st-century American women artists
21st-century American artists
Skowhegan School of Painting and Sculpture alumni